Asarco LLC (American Smelting and Refining Company) is a mining, smelting, and refining company based in Tucson, Arizona, which mines and processes primarily copper. The company has been a subsidiary of Grupo México since 1999.

Its three largest open-pit mines are the Mission, Silver Bell and Ray mines in Arizona.  Its mines produce  of copper a year. Asarco conducts solvent extraction and electrowinning at the Ray and Silver Bell mines in Pima County, Arizona, and Pinal County, Arizona, and operates a smelter in Hayden, Arizona.  Asarco's smelting plant in El Paso, Texas, was suspended in 1999 and then demolished on April 13, 2013. Before closing, the plant produced  of  anodes each year. Refining at the mines as well as at a copper refinery in Amarillo, Texas, produce  of refined copper each year.

Asarco's hourly workers are primarily represented by the United Steelworkers.

Asarco has 20 superfund sites across the United States, and it is subject to considerable litigation over pollution. After emerging from bankruptcy in 2008, it made a settlement with the government of $1.79 billion for contamination at various sites; the funds were allotted to the Environmental Protection Agency (EPA) for cleanup at 26 sites around the country.

History

Asarco was founded in 1888 as the American Smelting and Refining Company by Henry H. Rogers, William Rockefeller, Adolph Lewisohn, Robert S. Towne, Anton Eilers, and Leonard Lewisohn. From 1901 to 1959, American Smelting and Refining was included in the Dow Jones Industrial Average.

In April 1901, the Guggenheim family gained control of the company, and in 1905, bought the Tacoma smelter from the Bunker Hill Mining Company.  Asarco eventually controlled 90% of the U.S. lead production, essentially becoming a smelter trust.

On January 11, 1916, sixteen Asarco employees were killed and mutilated by Pancho Villa's men near the town of Santa Isabel, Chihuahua. It was one of the incidents that sparked the Mexican Expedition, a United States Army attempt to capture or kill Villa.

Based in Tucson, Arizona, the company grew to conduct mining, smelting, and refining of primarily copper. Open-pit mining is primarily utilized as the most efficient method of recovering this metal; the company's three largest such works are the Mission, Silver Bell, and the Ray mines in Arizona.  The company had also operated in silver mining in Idaho. Its mines produce  of copper a year.

Asarco conducts solvent extraction and electrowinning at the Ray and Silver Bell mines in Pima County, Arizona, and Pinal County, Arizona, and operates a smelter in Hayden, Arizona.  It also had a smelting plant in El Paso, Texas, operations of which were suspended.

In 1975 it officially changed its name to Asarco Incorporated. In 1999 it was acquired by Grupo México, which had begun as Asarco's 49%-owned Mexican subsidiary in 1965.

On August 9, 2005, the company filed for Chapter 11 bankruptcy in Corpus Christi, Texas under then-president Daniel Tellechea.

As of 2019, Asarco operates two primary locations in the United States, a mining and smelting complex in Arizona and a copper refinery in Amarillo, Texas.

Pollution and environmental issues

ASARCO has been found responsible for environmental pollution at 20 Superfund sites across the U.S. by the Environmental Protection Agency. Among those sites are:
American Smelting and Refining Co., located in Omaha, Nebraska. Plant dissembled, remediation completed and site reused.
Interstate Lead Company, or ILCO, labeled EPA Site ALD041906173, and located in Leeds, Jefferson County, Alabama
Argo Smelter, Omaha & Grant Smelter, labeled EPA Site COD002259588, and located at Vasquez Boulevard and I-70 in Denver, Colorado
"Smeltertown", El Paso County, Texas, where the copper plant's furnaces were illegally used to dispose of hazardous waste. The plant has since been dismantled.
California Gulch mine and river systems in Leadville, Colorado;
Summitville Consolidated Mining Corp., Inc. (SCMCI), now bankrupt, EPA Site COD983778432, in Del Norte, Rio Grande County, Colorado;
Asarco Globe Plant, EPA Site COD007063530, Globeville, near South Platte River, Denver and Adams County, Colorado;
Bunker Hill Mining and Metallurgical, Coeur d'Alene River Basin, Idaho;
Kin-Buc Landfill in New Jersey;
Tar Creek (Ottawa County) lead and zinc operations and surrounding residences in Oklahoma;
Commencement Bay, Near Shore/Tide Flats smelter, groundwater, and residences in Tacoma and Ruston, Washington.
Everett Smelter, Everett, Washington.
Murray, Utah lead smelter operation, since reclaimed as part of EPA Superfund program and now the location of the Intermountain Medical Center.

Litigation history

After the Colorado Department of Public Health and Environment sued Asarco for damages to natural resources in 1983, the EPA placed the ASARCO Globe Plant on its National Priorities List of Superfund sites, with Asarco to pay for the site's cleanup.

In 1972 Asarco's downtown Omaha plant in Nebraska was found to be releasing high amounts of lead into the air and ground surrounding the plant. In 1995 Asarco submitted a demolition and site cleanup plan to the Nebraska Department of Environmental Quality for their impact on the local residential area. Fined $3.6 million in 1996 for discharging lead and other pollutants into the Missouri River, Asarco closed its Omaha plant in July 1997. After extensive site cleanup, the land was turned over to the City of Omaha as a  park. All of East Omaha, comprising more than 8,000 acres (32 km²), was declared a Superfund site. As of 2003, 290 acres (1.2 km²) had been cleaned.

In 1991 the Coeur d'Alene Tribe filed suit under CERCLA against Hecla Mining Company, Asarco and other defendants for damages and cleanup costs downstream of what has been designated as the Bunker Hill Mine and Smelting Complex Superfund site. Contamination had affected Lake Coeur d'Alene and the Saint Joe River, as well as related waters and lands, and cleanup had been under way since the early 1980s. In 1996 the United States joined the suit. In 2008 after emerging from bankruptcy, Asarco LLC settled for $452 million for contributions to this site. This was part of a nearly $2 billion settlement (see below) with the US for a total of 26 sites. 

In 2007, the Environmental Protection Agency released the results of soil and air tests in Hayden, Arizona, taken adjacent to the Asarco Hayden Smelter. The results showed abnormally high amounts of pollutants that violate prescribed health standards.  Arsenic, lead and copper were among the most egregious pollutants found in Hayden. As a consequence of the contamination, the EPA proposed to add Hayden, Arizona, to the list of Federal Superfund sites. This action would provide funding to clean up the contamination. Asarco fought the action, supported by Democratic Gov. Janet Napolitano, who said: "I am asking that the EPA delay final decision on listing until March 31, 2008. This would provide ample time for the EPA, in close coordination with ADEQ, to enter an agreement with Asarco to conduct remedial actions..." After emerging from Chapter 11 bankruptcy in 2008, Asarco made a settlement with the government of $1.79 billion for contamination at various sites; the funds were allotted to the Environmental Protection Agency (EPA) for cleanup at 26 sites around the country. A final settlement for $1.79 billion was made in 2009 for up 80 sites, including one of the most notorious, the smelting plant at El Paso, Texas, for which cleanup was set to start in 2010.

Documentary 
Asarco's Tar Creek Superfund site was the subject of the film documentary Tar Creek (2009), made by Matt Myers. At one time, Tar Creek was considered to be the worst environmental problem on the EPA's list of more than 1200 sites.

See also
1913 El Paso smelters' strike
List of Superfund sites in Alabama
List of Superfund sites in Colorado
List of Superfund sites in Illinois
List of Superfund sites in Oklahoma
Picher, Oklahoma
Francis H. Brownell

References

External links

Official website
profile in International Directory of Company Histories, Vol. 4. St. James Press, 1991 (via fundinguniverse.com)
Grupo México history
 A Toxic Century: Mining Giant Asarco Must Clean Up Mess : NPR 2010
 Link to CNN transcript of the Asarco El Paso Video 2008
 Marilyn Berlin Snell,  "Going for Broke" Sierra Club Magazine, May/June 2006.
 Michael E. Ketterer, The Asarco El Paso Smelter: A Source of Local Contamination of Soils in El Paso (Texas), Ciudad Juarez (Chihuahua, Mexico), and Anapra (New Mexico), 2006.
Jake Bernstein, Clean up or Cover Up? "The Texas Observer", 2004.
 Corpus Christi's Refinery row
 Describes criminal conviction of an Asarco supplier
 Asarco Taylor Springs Illinois, Historical Society of Montgomery County Illinois

 
Companies based in Tucson, Arizona
Companies that filed for Chapter 11 bankruptcy in 2005
Former components of the Dow Jones Industrial Average
Metal companies of the United States
Copper mining companies of the United States
Smelting
Superfund sites in Colorado
Mines in Arizona